Mount Irvine is a peak rising to  between Vogler Peak and Hoehn Peak on Roa Ridge, the dividing ridge at the heads of Bartley Glacier and Matterhorn Glacier in Asgard Range, Victoria Land. The mountain was named by New Zealand Geographic Board (NZGB) (1998) after Sir Robin Irvine (1929–96), formerly Vice Chancellor of the University of Otago, Chairman of the Ross Dependency Research Committee and of the Antarctic New Zealand Board.

References

Mountains of the Asgard Range
McMurdo Dry Valleys